"You're Something Special to Me" is a song written by David Anthony, and recorded by American country music artist George Strait. It was released in December 1985 as the second and final single from his album Something Special.  The song peaked at #4 on the Billboard Hot Country Singles & Tracks and the Canadian RPM charts.

Critical reception
Kevin John Coyne of Country Universe gave the song an A grade, calling it "so laid back that it’s easy to miss the craftsmanship." He goes on to say that Strait "channels a young Merle Haggard, a slow western swing arrangement surrounds him with warmth."

Chart performance
This song peaked at #4 on both the Billboard Hot Country Songs chart and on the Canadian RPM Country Tracks chart.

References

1985 singles
George Strait songs
Song recordings produced by Jimmy Bowen
MCA Records singles
1985 songs